LIM homeobox 1 is a protein that in humans is encoded by the LHX1 gene. This gene encodes a member of a large protein family which contains the LIM domain, a unique cysteine-rich zinc-binding domain. The encoded protein is a transcription factor important for control of differentiation and development of neural and lymphoid cells. It is also key in development of renal and urogenital systems and is required for normal organogenesis. A similar protein in mice is an essential regulator of the vertebrate head organizer.

Function 

The Lim gene family is a subfamily of homeobox genes. The homeobox genes are essential in organizing the body plan of an organism and all contain the same conserved homeodomain of amino acids. Evidence that Lim-1 is essential to a developing organism is its conservation throughout evolution and presence in a variety of organisms. The Lim-1 gene encodes a transcription factor which binds to the DNA of specific genes and functions to produce the needed gene product for development of the organism. Lim-1 is important during early molecular development and is required in both primitive streak-derived tissue and visceral endoderm of the early embryo for development of a head. Studies done using mutant organisms without the Lim gene results in organisms that develop no head structure at all support the essential role of the Lim-1 gene in formation of the head. This gene has also been shown to play a crucial role in the formation of the female reproductive tract. The gene is expressed in the developing Müllerian duct of females, and when the gene is knocked out no reproductive tract forms. Recent studies have shown that Lim-1 mutations may be one cause of the Mayer-Rokitansky-Küster-Hauser (MRKH) syndrome. MRKH is characterized by defective development, or absence, of the uterus and upper part of the vagina in women with normal ovaries and karyotype.

Lim-1’s expression is controlled in part by the sonic hedgehog-Gli signaling pathway. Recent studies in mice have shown that Lim-1 silencing halts tumor growth and impairs tumor cell movement via inhibition of protein expression involved in metastatic spread. Therefore, in tumor cells Lim-1 acts as an oncogene. Thus, targeting Lim-1 can be a potential cancer therapy. In addition, Lim-1 is important in rodent renal development. Lim-1 deficiency results in development of multicystic kidney, whereas, its expression can contribute to pathogenesis of nephroblastomas. Also, Lim-1 plays a role in embryonic retinal development. Lim-1 expression affects differentiation and maintenance of horizontal cells located in the retinal, thus, it could serve as a marker in studies of horizontal cell specification.

Lim-1 (Lhx1) functions as a transcription factor necessary for regulating the production of coupling factors required for proper communication between the neurons located in the part of the brain responsible for regulation of circadian rhythms called the suprachiasmatic nucleus (SCN). In mouse studies where Lim-1 transcription was restricted at some point during development in utero, the individual units within the subject’s molecular clock functioned properly but were unable to work together. Communication of these units is required to match their release of clock proteins which begin a transcription cascade of many other proteins that produce functional responses in tissues. The cyclic pattern of these responses is due to the feedback of the clock proteins and consequent changes to this transcription cascade. Reduced Lim-1 expression leads to inadequate levels of proteins such as Vasoactive Intestinal Polypeptide (VIP) that work to produce the neuron coordination required for a regulated circadian rhythm. The lack of such coupling factors causes the circadian clock to not function properly because the units within the SCN cannot match their release of clock proteins, and therefore their transcriptional cascades of proteins that cause changes in arousal do not align.

References

Further reading